Reutlingen Hauptbahnhof is the main station in Reutlingen in the German State of Baden-Württemberg. In addition the city has halts (Haltepunkte) at Reutlingen West and in the suburbs of Betzingen and Sondelfingen. They all lie on the Plochingen–Immendingen railway. Reutlingen Süd (south) station (formerly called Eningen station) is no longer in operation.

History

After the citizens of Reutlingen had actively participated in the Revolution of 1848-49, the Württemberg government deliberately delayed the construction of the railway from Plochingen to Reutlingen. The station was finally opened on 20 September 1859. It had an administration building and a customs house, a freight shed, a locomotive depot and a repair workshop with a water supply point.

Until 1994, the Swabian Jura Railway (Schwäbische Albbahn) branched in Reutlingen station. The section of the line from Reutlingen to Kleinengstingen is now closed and dismantled. Until 1985, the Gönningen Railway branched here connecting Reutlingen and Gönningen. In addition, from 1899 to 1974 the Lokalbahn Reutlingen–Eningen (a tramway) operated from the station to Eningen unter Achalm.

Services

Long distance transport 
Since the timetable change in December 2009 Intercity trains have served Reutlingen. From Mondays to Thursdays they connect Tübingen via Stuttgart to Cologne, on Fridays they continue to Berlin: an intercity service runs to Stuttgart in the morning and returns in the evening.

Regional transport 
Regionalbahn services run from Reutlingen to Bad Urach, Herrenberg, Horb am Neckar and Plochingen and Regional-Express services run to Stuttgart and Tübingen. Interregio-Express services connect to Aulendorf, Rottenburg am Neckar and Stuttgart.

Local transport 
The station from 1899 to 1974 was the focal point of the Reutlingen Tramway. Today it has this role for most of the bus lines of the city bus company, Reutlinger Stadtverkehrsgesellschaft (RSV).

Infrastructure 
Reutlingen station has three main platform tracks. The sprawling freight yard has been closed for some years, but the tracks are intact.

References

External links
 

Railway stations in Baden-Württemberg
Reutlingen
Buildings and structures in Reutlingen (district)
Railway stations in Germany opened in 1859